Habib Al-Wotayan (born 8 August 1996) is a Saudi Arabian professional footballer who plays as a goalkeeper for Saudi Professional League side Al-Hilal.

Career

Al-Fateh
Al-Wotayan started his career with Al-Fateh where he was promoted from the youth team to the first team in 2015. He played his first match against Al-Ahli. He participated after the first-choice goalkeeper Maksym Koval was injured.

Al-Hilal
On October 21, 2020, Al-Wotayan signed with Al-Hilal. On 30 January 2022, Al-Wotayan joined Al-Hazem on loan.

Career statistics

Honours
Al-Hilal
Saudi Professional League: 2020–21
King Cup: 2019–20
Saudi Super Cup: 2021
AFC Champions League: 2021

References

External links
 

1996 births
Living people
People from Al-Hasa
Association football goalkeepers
Saudi Arabian footballers
Saudi Professional League players
Al-Fateh SC players
Al Hilal SFC players
Al-Hazem F.C. players
Saudi Arabia youth international footballers
Saudi Arabia international footballers
Saudi Arabian Shia Muslims